Doug's Beach State Park is a public recreation area in the Columbia River Gorge lying  east of Lyle in Klickitat County, Washington. The state park occupies  along Washington State Route 14 at one of the premier windsurfing sites on the Columbia River. The park also offers picnicking, fishing, and swimming.

History
Washington State Parks acquired the site through a land swap with the Department of Natural Resources. It bears the name of windsurfer Doug Campbell, who helped popularize the sport at this spot.

References

External links
Doug's Beach State Park Washington State Parks and Recreation Commission 
Doug's Beach State Park Map Washington State Parks and Recreation Commission

Parks in Klickitat County, Washington
State parks of Washington (state)